Sir Charles Frederick Carter  (15 August 1919 – 27 June 2002) was an English academic known primarily for his role as the founding Vice-Chancellor of Lancaster University.

Early life
Carter was born in Rugby to a father who was an electrical engineer and the developer of the Carter coefficient, and a mother who was an active member of the Society of Friends. He lived in Long Itchington.

He was educated at Lawrence Sheriff School and St John's College, Cambridge, where he read Mathematics and Economics and attained a First. His brother Geoffrey was a Professor of Engineering, who attended the same school.

Career
In World War II Carter refused to fight, being a conscientious objector, and because he refused to accept any conditions for his exemption he spent three months in Strangeways Prison, Manchester. When released, he joined the Friends' Relief Service, where he met Janet Shea, whom he married in 1944.

In 1945, he returned to Cambridge, where he became a lecturer in statistics and, from 1947, a fellow of Emmanuel College, Cambridge. He remained at Cambridge until 1952, when he took the Chair of Applied Economics at Queen's University, Belfast. Whilst in Northern Ireland he became a student of The Troubles, and concluded that a Protestant monopoly on power was unacceptable and could not be sustained. He also chaired the Northern Ireland Economic Development Council. In 1959 he moved to the Stanley Jevons chair in Manchester, remaining there for four years.

As an economist, he was a follower of G.L.S. Shackle, and was concerned about the impact of expectations in human decisions.

In 1963, he became the founding Vice-Chancellor of the new University of Lancaster. He managed to admit the first 264 students in 1964, a year ahead of schedule, by utilising disused buildings as temporary accommodation and teaching facilities. Carter's vision was for Lancaster to be a university for the whole North West, commenting that the people of Lancashire thought of it as their university. He refused "discrimination on the grounds of race, colour, politics or any other thing" and established links with various Higher Education Colleges, thus pre-empting the drive for widening participation forty years later.

Personal life
His tenure at the University of Lancaster ended in 1979, the same year he was knighted. He retired to Seascale, Cumbria, and continued to work on projects he deemed to be worthwhile.

Works

References

External links
Obituaries of Charles Carter
History of Lancaster

1919 births
2002 deaths
Alumni of St John's College, Cambridge
British conscientious objectors
British Quakers
British economists
Knights Bachelor
Fellows of the British Academy
People educated at Lawrence Sheriff School
People from Rugby, Warwickshire
People from Stratford-on-Avon District
People from the Borough of Copeland